Mack Creek is a river located in Seneca County, New York. It flows into Cayuga Lake by Elm Beach, New York.

References

Rivers of Seneca County, New York
Rivers of New York (state)